The Veils are an English/New Zealand indie rock band fronted by singer and songwriter Finn Andrews.

History

Early years, The Runaway Found (2001–2004) 
Finn Andrews was born in London but spent his teenage years at high school in Auckland, New Zealand. Largely disinterested in school, Finn was also playing in many bands (one of which met and played regularly in a folk club on Mt Victoria in Devonport, Auckland) and writing the songs that would later comprise The Veils debut album The Runaway Found. When he was 16, a set of demos he sent to record companies created a stir and led to invitations for him to return to London and make a record.

The Veils were signed almost immediately to Blanco y Negro, an indie/major hybrid imprint led by Rough Trade's boss Geoff Travis. On 19 August 2002 the band released a promo only single "Death & Co.", while a proper commercial single release came three months later, on 18 November, for "More Heat Than Light" followed by "The Leavers Dance" (24 February 2003), which was distributed exclusively at gigs.

By then increasing contractual disparities and artistic differences between the head of Warner and Geoff Travis delayed plans for a debut album. The Blanco Y Negro label was eventually disbanded and the dispute turned into a court battle, with The Veils eventually regaining ownership of their master recordings from Warner Music.
By mid-2003 Geoff Travis had signed them to Rough Trade Records.

The Veils recorded four more songs with producer Bernard Butler (ex-Suede guitarist), and the band finally released its first Rough Trade single, "Guiding Light" on 28 July 2003. Single releases of "Lavinia" (24 November 2003) and "The Wild Son" (26 January 2004) led to The Runaway Found finally hitting the shelves on 16 February 2004. Though rapturously received by the critics, by the time of its release Andrews felt unhappy with the direction the band had taken and, allegedly following altercations between him and other members, The Veils' first incarnation split mid-2004, just 2 months after their debut album's release.

Nux Vomica (2005–2006) 
Andrews left the UK early 2005 and embarked on a solo tour of America and Japan, eventually returning home to New Zealand where he found a new direction for the band. He spent the summer there rehearsing with high-school friends Liam Gerrard (keyboards) and Sophia Burn (bass) in Liam's bedroom, soon amassing an album's worth of material. When the trio returned to London they were joined by Dan Raishbrook (guitar) and Henning Dietz (drums), who completed the new line-up. They began recording sessions with producer Nick Launay in Los Angeles in early 2006. 
The resulting album Nux Vomica had a darker, far heavier and more complex sound, augmented by string arrangements by ex Lounge Lizard Jane Scarpantoni, but also a newly found, highly animalistic energy. Lead singer Finn Andrews shows "rougher" and more experimental vocals on many of the songs such as 'Not Yet' and 'Jesus for the Jugular'. Two singles were released from the album: "Advice for Young Mothers to Be" (4 September 2006) and "One Night on Earth" (15 April 2007). Nux Vomica featured on 16 English and American critics' best of the year lists in 2006.

Sun Gangs (2007–2009) 
In the 16 months following the release of Nux Vomica The Veils played over 250 shows across 15 countries, and during the U.S. leg of the tour it was announced that keyboardist Liam Gerrard would leave the band to return home to New Zealand due to personal reasons. The Veils carried on as a four-piece and, whilst living out of a classic car garage in Oklahoma City, started recording new demos at The Flaming Lips studio between playing shows on the east and west coasts of the America. By mid-2008 they were back to London to begin work on their third album with producer Graham Sutton. The recording sessions at West Point Studios lasted only three weeks, and at the end of the summer the album was done and ready to be mixed. Sun Gangs was released on 6 April 2009 and was featured in many websites top albums of 2009.

Troubles of the Brain EP (2010–2011) 
The band spent the summer of 2010 working on new material. On 6 December it was announced that a new 7-song EP entitled Troubles of the Brain was set to be released on 24 January, and that the band had left Rough Trade after almost 9 years and started their own label, Pitch Beast Records. The EP is produced by Finn Andrews and Bernard Butler and was recorded at Finn's home studio in London. In March 2011, The Veils headlined a benefit concert for the NZ Red Cross in London, playing a selection of songs from the EP.

Time Stays, We Go (2013) 
The Veils' fourth album was recorded in Laurel Canyon, Los Angeles and was released in April 2013. In January the band recorded a 5-song live session at Abbey Road Studios which was also turned into a short film and released as exclusive content with the new record.

Following their album's release The Veils embarked on a 150-date world tour with shows selling out all across North America, Europe and New Zealand.

Once the tour finished Finn Andrews revealed in an interview for NME that the band had moved into their own studio in east London and had already begun work on a new record due for release in 2016. Finn also revealed he had been commissioned to write an orchestral piece to commemorate the antipodean dead of World War I to be performed in Belgium in spring 2016.

Total Depravity (2016) 
In June The Veils announced their fifth album 'Total Depravity' was to be released on 26 August 2016. The album was recorded in Los Angeles, London, New York and Porto and features production by El-P, Adam Greenspan and Dean Hurley. During the same month David Lynch also announced Finn Andrews would appear in the new series of Twin Peaks. The album cover features artwork by Italian artist Nicola Samori. The video for Axolotl was filmed on Bethells Beach in Auckland, New Zealand and features a Charles Darwin-like figure in the midst of a surreal exorcism in the Desert, eventually transforming into a large tentacled figure in a hat. The Veils then announced a world tour in support of the record will begin in Europe in October.

Twin Peaks
In 2016, David Lynch announced that Finn Andrews would appear in the revival of Twin Peaks. The band appeared performing the song "AXOLOTL" in the 15th part, aired on 21 August 2017.

Notable contributions and appearances
The Veils have been praised by film directors David Lynch, Paolo Sorrentino and Tim Burton, all of whom have used songs by them on their soundtracks. The Veils have also recently collaborated on a new album with producer El-P/Run The Jewels.

 Paolo Sorrentino used The Veils song "Nux Vomica" in its entirety in his 2008 Italian political thriller Il Divo.
 "Jesus For the Jugular" was used for the trailer of the HBO series Luck in the United States in 2011.
 Tim Burton used "Another Night on Earth" on the soundtrack for Frankenweenie.
 Lee Tamahori used "Jesus For the Jugular" in his film The Devil's Double in 2008.
 "The Valleys of New Orleans" was used repeatedly by HBO during their Hurricane Katrina fund raising campaign in 2005. The song begins with a lyric about a large hurricane tearing through New Orleans but was in fact highly prescient having been written three years prior to Katrina.
 "Vicious Traditions" was used during the end sequence of the film Mr Brooks in 2007.
 "The Stars Came Out Once The Lights Went Out" was used as the opening theme of the New Zealand comedy-drama Nothing Trivial (2011-2014).

Style and influences

According to PopMatters writer Dan Raper, the Veils' songs "tend to fall into two categories: darkly gothic, depressive rock songs, and seemingly upbeat, catchy pop songs that’ll fool you into thinking they are as positive with their initial blast of keyboards and syncopation." The Veils' sound has been classified as indie rock, alternative rock, folk rock, gothic rock,  post-punk and Southern Gothic.

Discography

Studio albums

EPs

Singles

Music videos

References

External links 

 
 The Veils on Facebook
 The Veils fan forum
 Rough Trade Records

New Zealand indie rock groups
Blanco y Negro Records artists
Rough Trade Records artists
Nettwerk Records artists
British indie rock groups
English gothic rock groups
English post-punk music groups
Musical groups from London